"I Wonder Why" is a song by American singer and songwriter Curtis Stigers, released as the first single from his eponymous debut album on August 12, 1991, in the United States. The song reached number four on the Danish and Irish singles charts, number five on the UK Singles Chart, and number nine on the US Billboard Hot 100. It also reached the top 10 in Belgium, Denmark, Germany, the Netherlands, and Norway.

Track listings
7-inch single and US cassette single
 "I Wonder Why"
 "Nobody Loves You Like I Do"

Australian CD single
 "I Wonder Why"
 "Nobody Loves You Like I Do"
 "The Man You're Gonna Fall in Love With"

Charts

Weekly charts

Year-end charts

Release history

Cover versions
Craig David covered the song on his 2010 album Signed Sealed Delivered.

References

1991 debut singles
1991 songs
Arista Records singles
Bertelsmann Music Group singles
Curtis Stigers songs
Pop ballads
Song recordings produced by Glen Ballard
Songs written by Glen Ballard